Acid reducer may refer to:

 Antacid, a substance which neutralizes stomach acid
 H2 blocker, a medication that reduces and blocks the production of stomach acid
 Proton-pump inhibitor, a medication that reduces and blocks the production of stomach acid